Luxgen Motor Co., Ltd. is a Taiwanese automotive manufacturer headquartered in Miaoli County, Taiwan, and a wholly owned subsidiary of Yulon Motor.
 
Luxgen was founded in 2009, and the company's motto is "Think Ahead." From 2010 to 2020, Luxgen vehicles were manufactured and marketed in China by Dongfeng Yulon. Currently, Luxgen products are primarily manufactured and marketed in Taiwan.

History

Luxgen made its first overseas sale in Oman in 2010, as part of a plan to focus on the Middle East, Latin America, Central America and South America, Russia, China and Southeast Asia car markets. Further sales were made in the Dominican Republic.

In 2011, Luxgen topped the J.D. Power Customer Service Index (CSI) in Taiwan among locally produced car brands.

Luxgen entered the Russian market in 2013 followed by the Iranian market in 2017.

Luxgen ranks highest among Mass Market Brands according to the J.D. Power 2018 Taiwan Customer Satisfaction Index (CSI) Study.

In 2020, the company announced it would exit from China due to sluggish sales.

Current products

URX

The Luxgen URX debut in 2019. The URX is a midsize crossover based on the U6's platform.

U6

The Luxgen U6 debut in 2013 and facelift in 2017 being U6 GT and U6 GT225 models. The U6 is a compact crossover.

Discontinued products

M7

Luxgen's first production model was the Luxgen M7 minivan, which was launched as the Luxgen 7 MPV before the facelift in 2014. It was officially shown to the public for the first time on August 19, 2009, and went on sale in Taiwan on September 19, 2009. Luxgen7 MPV was being developed in collaboration with AC Propulsion. 
In 2010, the EV+ model was introduced, which is an electric vehicle.

V7

The Luxgen V7 is basically a wheelchair accessible version of the M7 which has a lower extended tailgate and extended roof. The V7 was later revealed in production version during the 2016 Taipei Auto Show.

S3

Luxgen S3 is a sub-compact sedan which was released in 2016. Luxgen S3 was discontinued in 2020.

S5

Originally launched as the Luxgen 5 Sedan, Luxgen S5 is a compact sedan which was unveiled in November 2011 at the Taipei Auto Show and then officially launched in the second quarter of 2012. It was the first wholly self-developed Taiwanese car. The design of the S5 was first seen in the Neora concept car.

Luxgen S5 was discontinued in 2020.

U5

The Luxgen U5 debuted in Q3, 2017. The U5 is a subcompact crossover based on the S3's platform. Luxgen U5 was discontinued in 2020.

U7

The Luxgen U7 is Luxgen's second product. It was revealed on June 4, 2010. The U7 was initially named the Luxgen 7 SUV, with the name changing to U7 during the facelift. Both the M7 and U7 are powered by a 2.2 L turbocharged 4-cylinder petrol engine. Luxgen U7 was discontinued in 2020.

MBU
The Luxgen MBU debuted in 2019. The MBU is a performance crossover aimed to replace the U7.

Product Gallery

See also
 List of companies of Taiwan
 List of Taiwanese automakers

References

External links
 
 Luxgen Latin America

2009 establishments in Taiwan
Electric vehicle manufacturers of China
Car manufacturers of Taiwan
Taiwanese brands
Car brands
Vehicle manufacturing companies established in 2009